The 1977 NCAA Division II Soccer Championship was the sixth annual tournament held by the NCAA to determine the top men's Division II college soccer program in the United States.

Alabama A&M defeated Seattle Pacific in the final match, 2–1, to win their first national title. This was the Falcons' third defeat in the final match, after losing appearances in 1974 and 1975. The final was played in Miami, Florida on December 3, 1977.

Bracket

Final

See also  
 1977 NCAA Division I Soccer Tournament
 1977 NCAA Division III Soccer Championship
 1977 NAIA Soccer Championship

References 

NCAA Division II Men's Soccer Championship
NCAA Division II Men's Soccer Championship
NCAA Division II Men's Soccer Championship
NCAA Division II Men's Soccer Championship
Soccer in Florida